Harold Rogers may refer to:

 Harold A. Rogers (1899–1994), founder of Kin Canada
 Hal Rogers (born 1937), American politician; U.S. Congressman from Kentucky

See also
Harry Rogers (disambiguation)
Harold Rodgers (1881–1947), the third Anglican Bishop of Sherborne in the modern era